The 1885 Mississippi gubernatorial election took place on November 3, 1885, in order to elect the Governor of Mississippi. Incumbent Governor Robert Lowry ran for reelection to a second term.

General election
In the general election, Democratic candidate Robert Lowry, the incumbent governor, defeated independent candidate Put Darden in a landslide.

Results

References

1885
gubernatorial
Mississippi
November 1885 events